The Pacific Ocean is the largest and deepest of Earth's five oceanic divisions. It extends from the Arctic Ocean in the north to the Southern Ocean (or, depending on definition, to Antarctica) in the south, and is bounded by the continents of Asia and Oceania in the west and the Americas in the east.

At  in area (as defined with a southern Antarctic border), this largest division of the World Ocean and the hydrosphere covers about 46% of Earth's water surface and about 32% of its total surface area, larger than Earth's entire land area combined . The centers of both the Water Hemisphere and the Western Hemisphere, as well as the  oceanic pole of inaccessibility are in the Pacific Ocean. Ocean circulation (caused by the Coriolis effect) subdivides it into two largely independent volumes of water, which meet at the equator: the North Pacific Ocean and the South Pacific Ocean (or more loosely the South Seas). These oceans may be divided to describe the Northeast Pacific Ocean with its coasts along North America, the Southeast Pacific (South America), Northwest Pacific (East Asia), and the Southwest Pacific (Oceania).

The third deepest point on Earth, the Sirena Deep, is also located in the Mariana Trench.

The western Pacific has many major marginal seas, including the Philippine Sea, South China Sea, East China Sea, Sea of Japan, Sea of Okhotsk, Bering Sea, Gulf of Alaska, Mar de Grau, Tasman Sea, and the Coral Sea.

Etymology
In the early 16th century, Spanish explorer Vasco Núñez de Balboa crossed the Isthmus of Panama in 1513 and sighted the great "Southern Sea" which he named  (in Spanish). Afterwards, the ocean's current name was coined by Portuguese explorer Ferdinand Magellan during the Spanish circumnavigation of the world in 1521, as he encountered favorable winds on reaching the ocean. He called it , which in both Portuguese and Spanish means 'peaceful sea'.

Largest seas in the Pacific Ocean

Top large seas:

 Australasian Mediterranean Sea – 9.080 million km2
 Philippine Sea – 5.695 million km2
 Coral Sea – 4.791 million km2
 Chilean Sea – 3.6 million km2
 South China Sea – 3.5 million km2
 Tasman Sea – 2.3 million km2
 Bering Sea – 2 million km2
 Sea of Okhotsk – 1.583 million km2
 Gulf of Alaska – 1.533 million km2
 East China Sea – 1.249 million km2
 Mar de Grau – 1.14 million km2
 Sea of Japan – 978,000 km2
 Solomon Sea – 720,000 km2
 Banda Sea – 695,000 km2
 Arafura Sea – 650,000 km2
 Timor Sea – 610,000 km2
 Yellow Sea – 380,000 km2
 Java Sea – 320,000 km2
 Gulf of Thailand – 320,000 km2
 Gulf of Carpentaria – 300,000 km2
 Celebes Sea – 280,000 km2
 Sulu Sea – 260,000 km2
 Bismarck Sea – 250,400 km2
 Gulf of Anadyr – 200,000 km2
 Molucca Sea – 200,000 km2
 Gulf of California – 160,000 km2
 Gulf of Tonkin – 126,250 km2
 Halmahera Sea – 95,000 km2
 Bohai Sea – 78,000 km2
 Gulf of Papua – 70,400 km2
 Koro Sea – 58,000 km2
 Bali Sea – 45,000 km2
 Savu Sea – 35,000 km2
 Seto Inland Sea – 23,203 km2
 Salish Sea - 18,000 km2
 Seram Sea – 12,000 km2

History

Prehistory 
Across the continents of Asia, Australia and the Americas, more than 25,000 islands, large and small, rise above the surface of the Pacific Ocean. Multiple islands were the shells of erstwhile active volcanoes, that have lain dormant for thousands of years. Close to the equator through vast areas of blue ocean are a dot of atolls that have over intervals of time been formed by seamounts as a result of tiny coral islands strung in a ring within surroundings of a central lagoon.

Early migrations 

Important human migrations occurred in the Pacific in prehistoric times. Modern humans first reached the western Pacific in the Paleolithic, at around 60,000 to 70,000 years ago. Originating from a southern coastal human migration out of Africa, they reached East Asia, Mainland Southeast Asia, the Philippines, New Guinea, and then Australia by making the sea crossing of at least  between Sundaland and Sahul. It is not known with any certainty what level of maritime technology was used by these groupsthe presumption is that they used large bamboo rafts which may have been equipped with some sort of sail. The reduction in favourable winds for a crossing to Sahull after 58,000 B.P. fits with the dating of the settlement of Australia, with no later migrations in the prehistoric period.

The descendants of these migrations today are the Negritos, Melanesians, and Indigenous Australians. Their populations in maritime Southeast Asia, coastal New Guinea, and Island Melanesia later intermarried with the incoming Austronesian settlers from Taiwan and the northern Philippines, but also earlier groups associated with Austroasiatic-speakers, resulting in the modern peoples of Island Southeast Asia and Oceania.

A later seaborne migration is the Neolithic Austronesian expansion of the Austronesian peoples. Austronesians originated from the island of Taiwan c. 3000-1500 BCE. They are associated with distinctive maritime sailing technologies (notably outrigger boats, catamarans, lashed-lug boats, and the crab claw sail)it is likely that the progressive development of these technologies were related to the later steps of settlement into Near and Remote Oceania. Starting at around 2200 BCE, Austronesians sailed southwards to settle the Philippines. From, probably, the Bismarck Archipelago they crossed the western Pacific to reach the Marianas Islands by 1500 BCE, as well as Palau and Yap by 1000 BCE. They were the first humans to reach Remote Oceania, and the first to cross vast distances of open water. They also continued spreading southwards and settling the rest of Maritime Southeast Asia, reaching Indonesia and Malaysia by 1500 BCE, and further west to Madagascar and the Comoros in the Indian Ocean by around 500 CE. More recently, it is suggested that Austronesians expanded already earlier, arriving in the Philippines already in 7000 BCE. Additional earlier migrations into Insular Southeast Asia, associated with Austroasiatic-speakers from Mainland Southeast Asia, are estimated to have taken place already in 15000 BCE.

At around 1300 to 1200 BCE, a branch of the Austronesian migrations known as the Lapita culture reached the Bismarck Archipelago, the Solomon Islands, Vanuatu, Fiji, and New Caledonia. From there, they settled Tonga and Samoa by 900 to 800 BCE. Some also back-migrated northwards in 200 BCE to settle the islands of eastern Micronesia (including the Carolines, the Marshall Islands, and Kiribati), mixing with earlier Austronesian migrations in the region. This remained the furthest extent of the Austronesian expansion into Polynesia until around 700 CE when there was another surge of island exploration. They reached the Cook Islands, Tahiti, and the Marquesas by 700 CE; Hawaii by 900 CE; Rapa Nui by 1000 CE; and finally New Zealand by 1200 CE. Austronesians may have also reached as far as the Americas, although evidence for this remains inconclusive.

European exploration

The first contact of European navigators with the western edge of the Pacific Ocean was made by the Portuguese expeditions of António de Abreu and Francisco Serrão, via the Lesser Sunda Islands, to the Maluku Islands, in 1512, and with Jorge Álvares's expedition to southern China in 1513, both ordered by Afonso de Albuquerque from Malacca.

The eastern side of the ocean was encountered by Spanish explorer Vasco Núñez de Balboa in 1513 after his expedition crossed the Isthmus of Panama and reached a new ocean. He named it Mar del Sur ("Sea of the South" or "South Sea") because the ocean was to the south of the coast of the isthmus where he first observed the Pacific.

In 1520, navigator Ferdinand Magellan and his crew were the first to cross the Pacific in recorded history. They were part of a Spanish expedition to the Spice Islands that would eventually result in the first world circumnavigation. Magellan called the ocean Pacífico (or "Pacific" meaning, "peaceful") because, after sailing through the stormy seas off Cape Horn, the expedition found calm waters. The ocean was often called the Sea of Magellan in his honor until the eighteenth century. Magellan stopped at one uninhabited Pacific island before stopping at Guam in March 1521. Although Magellan himself died in the Philippines in 1521, Spanish navigator Juan Sebastián Elcano led the remains of the expedition back to Spain across the Indian Ocean and round the Cape of Good Hope, completing the first world circumnavigation in 1522. Sailing around and east of the Moluccas, between 1525 and 1527, Portuguese expeditions encountered the Caroline Islands, the Aru Islands, and Papua New Guinea. In 1542–43 the Portuguese also reached Japan.

In 1564, five Spanish ships carrying 379 soldiers crossed the ocean from Mexico led by Miguel López de Legazpi, and colonized the Philippines and Mariana Islands. For the remainder of the 16th century, Spain maintained military and mercantile control, with ships sailing from Mexico and Peru across the Pacific Ocean to the Philippines via Guam, and establishing the Spanish East Indies. The Manila galleons operated for two and a half centuries, linking Manila and Acapulco, in one of the longest trade routes in history. Spanish expeditions also arrived at Tuvalu, the Marquesas, the Cook Islands, the Solomon Islands, and the Admiralty Islands in the South Pacific.

Later, in the quest for Terra Australis ("the [great] Southern Land"), Spanish explorations in the 17th century, such as the expedition led by the Portuguese navigator Pedro Fernandes de Queirós, arrived at the Pitcairn and Vanuatu archipelagos, and sailed the Torres Strait between Australia and New Guinea, named after navigator Luís Vaz de Torres. Dutch explorers, sailing around southern Africa, also engaged in exploration and trade; Willem Janszoon, made the first completely documented European landing in Australia (1606), in Cape York Peninsula, and Abel Janszoon Tasman circumnavigated and landed on parts of the Australian continental coast and arrived at Tasmania and New Zealand in 1642.

In the 16th and 17th centuries, Spain considered the Pacific Ocean a mare clausum—a sea closed to other naval powers. As the only known entrance from the Atlantic, the Strait of Magellan was at times patrolled by fleets sent to prevent the entrance of non-Spanish ships. On the western side of the Pacific Ocean the Dutch threatened the Spanish Philippines.

The 18th century marked the beginning of major exploration by the Russians in Alaska and the Aleutian Islands, such as the First Kamchatka expedition and the Great Northern Expedition, led by the Danish Russian navy officer Vitus Bering. Spain also sent expeditions to the Pacific Northwest, reaching Vancouver Island in southern Canada, and Alaska. The French explored and colonized Polynesia, and the British made three voyages with James Cook to the South Pacific and Australia, Hawaii, and the North American Pacific Northwest. In 1768, Pierre-Antoine Véron, a young astronomer accompanying Louis Antoine de Bougainville on his voyage of exploration, established the width of the Pacific with precision for the first time in history. One of the earliest voyages of scientific exploration was organized by Spain in the Malaspina Expedition of 1789–1794. It sailed vast areas of the Pacific, from Cape Horn to Alaska, Guam and the Philippines, New Zealand, Australia, and the South Pacific.

New Imperialism 

Growing imperialism during the 19th century resulted in the occupation of much of Oceania by European powers, and later Japan and the United States. Significant contributions to oceanographic knowledge were made by the voyages of HMS Beagle in the 1830s, with Charles Darwin aboard; HMS Challenger during the 1870s; the USS Tuscarora (1873–76); and the German Gazelle (1874–76).

In Oceania, France obtained a leading position as imperial power after making Tahiti and New Caledonia protectorates in 1842 and 1853, respectively. After navy visits to Easter Island in 1875 and 1887, Chilean navy officer Policarpo Toro negotiated the incorporation of the island into Chile with native Rapanui in 1888. By occupying Easter Island, Chile joined the imperial nations. By 1900 nearly all Pacific islands were in control of Britain, France, United States, Germany, Japan, and Chile.

Although the United States gained control of Guam and the Philippines from Spain in 1898, Japan controlled most of the western Pacific by 1914 and occupied many other islands during the Pacific War; however, by the end of that war, Japan was defeated and the U.S. Pacific Fleet was the virtual master of the ocean. The Japanese-ruled Northern Mariana Islands came under the control of the United States. Since the end of World War II, many former colonies in the Pacific have become independent states.

Geography 

The Pacific separates Asia and Australia from the Americas. It may be further subdivided by the equator into northern (North Pacific) and southern (South Pacific) portions. It extends from the Antarctic region in the South to the Arctic in the north. The Pacific Ocean encompasses approximately one-third of the Earth's surface, having an area of — larger than Earth's entire landmass combined, .

By contrast, the Atlantic Ocean is increasing in size.

Along the Pacific Ocean's irregular western margins lie many seas, the largest of which are the Celebes Sea, Coral Sea, East China Sea (East Sea), Philippine Sea, Sea of Japan, South China Sea (South Sea), Sulu Sea, Tasman Sea, and Yellow Sea (West Sea of Korea). The Indonesian Seaway (including the Strait of Malacca and Torres Strait) joins the Pacific and the Indian Ocean to the west, and Drake Passage and the Strait of Magellan link the Pacific with the Atlantic Ocean on the east. To the north, the Bering Strait connects the Pacific with the Arctic Ocean.

As the Pacific straddles the 180th meridian, the West Pacific (or western Pacific, near Asia) is in the Eastern Hemisphere, while the East Pacific (or eastern Pacific, near the Americas) is in the Western Hemisphere.

The Southern Pacific Ocean harbors the Southeast Indian Ridge crossing from south of Australia turning into the Pacific-Antarctic Ridge (north of the South Pole) and merges with another ridge (south of South America) to form the East Pacific Rise which also connects with another ridge (south of North America) which overlooks the Juan de Fuca Ridge.

For most of Magellan's voyage from the Strait of Magellan to the Philippines, the explorer indeed found the ocean peaceful; however, the Pacific is not always peaceful. Many tropical storms batter the islands of the Pacific. The lands around the Pacific Rim are full of volcanoes and often affected by earthquakes. Tsunamis, caused by underwater earthquakes, have devastated many islands and in some cases destroyed entire towns.

The Martin Waldseemüller map of 1507 was the first to show the Americas separating two distinct oceans. Later, the Diogo Ribeiro map of 1529 was the first to show the Pacific at about its proper size.

Bordering countries and territories

Sovereign nations 

 Australia
 Brunei
 Cambodia
 Canada
 Chile
 China
 Colombia
 Costa Rica
 Ecuador
 El Salvador
 Federated States of Micronesia
 Fiji
 Guatemala
 Honduras
 Indonesia
 Japan
 Kiribati
 Malaysia
 Marshall Islands
 Mexico
 Nauru
 New Zealand
 Nicaragua
 North Korea
 Palau
 Panama
 Papua New Guinea
 Peru
 Philippines
 Russia
 Samoa
 Singapore
 Solomon Islands
 South Korea
 Taiwan
 Thailand
 Timor-Leste
 Tonga
 Tuvalu
 United States
 Vanuatu
 Vietnam

Territories 

 American Samoa (US)
 Baker Island (US)
 Clipperton Island (France)
 Cook Islands (New Zealand)
 Coral Sea Islands (Australia)
 French Polynesia (France)
 Guam (US)
 Hong Kong (China)
 Howland Island (US)
 Jarvis Island (US)
 Johnston Island (US)
 Kingman Reef (US)
 Macau (China)
 Macquarie Island (Australia)
 Midway Atoll (US)
 New Caledonia (France)
 Norfolk Island (Australia)
 Northern Mariana Islands (US)
 Niue (New Zealand)
 Palmyra Atoll (US)
 Pitcairn Islands (UK)
 Tokelau (New Zealand)
 Wallis and Futuna (France)
 Wake Island (US)

Landmasses and islands 

The Pacific Ocean has most of the islands in the world. There are about 25,000 islands in the Pacific Ocean. The islands entirely within the Pacific Ocean can be divided into three main groups known as Micronesia, Melanesia and Polynesia. Micronesia, which lies north of the equator and west of the International Date Line, includes the Mariana Islands in the northwest, the Caroline Islands in the center, the Marshall Islands to the east and the islands of Kiribati in the southeast.

Melanesia, to the southwest, includes New Guinea, the world's second largest island after Greenland and by far the largest of the Pacific islands. The other main Melanesian groups from north to south are the Bismarck Archipelago, the Solomon Islands, Santa Cruz, Vanuatu, Fiji and New Caledonia.

The largest area, Polynesia, stretching from Hawaii in the north to New Zealand in the south, also encompasses Tuvalu, Tokelau, Samoa, Tonga and the Kermadec Islands to the west, the Cook Islands, Society Islands and Austral Islands in the center, and the Marquesas Islands, Tuamotu, Mangareva Islands, and Easter Island to the east.

Islands in the Pacific Ocean are of four basic types: continental islands, high islands, coral reefs and uplifted coral platforms. Continental islands lie outside the andesite line and include New Guinea, the islands of New Zealand, and the Philippines. Some of these islands are structurally associated with nearby continents. High islands are of volcanic origin, and many contain active volcanoes. Among these are Bougainville, Hawaii, and the Solomon Islands.

The coral reefs of the South Pacific are low-lying structures that have built up on basaltic lava flows under the ocean's surface. One of the most dramatic is the Great Barrier Reef off northeastern Australia with chains of reef patches. A second island type formed of coral is the uplifted coral platform, which is usually slightly larger than the low coral islands. Examples include Banaba (formerly Ocean Island) and Makatea in the Tuamotu group of French Polynesia.

Water characteristics

Salinity also varies latitudinally, reaching a maximum of 37 parts per thousand in the southeastern area. The water near the equator, which can have a salinity as low as 34 parts per thousand, is less salty than that found in the mid-latitudes because of abundant equatorial precipitation throughout the year. The lowest counts of less than 32 parts per thousand are found in the far north as less evaporation of seawater takes place in these frigid areas. The motion of Pacific waters is generally clockwise in the Northern Hemisphere (the North Pacific gyre) and counter-clockwise in the Southern Hemisphere. The North Equatorial Current, driven westward along latitude 15°N by the trade winds, turns north near the Philippines to become the warm Japan or Kuroshio Current.

Turning eastward at about 45°N, the Kuroshio forks and some water moves northward as the Aleutian Current, while the rest turns southward to rejoin the North Equatorial Current. The Aleutian Current branches as it approaches North America and forms the base of a counter-clockwise circulation in the Bering Sea. Its southern arm becomes the chilled slow, south-flowing California Current. The South Equatorial Current, flowing west along the equator, swings southward east of New Guinea, turns east at about 50°S, and joins the main westerly circulation of the South Pacific, which includes the Earth-circling Antarctic Circumpolar Current. As it approaches the Chilean coast, the South Equatorial Current divides; one branch flows around Cape Horn and the other turns north to form the Peru or Humboldt Current.

Climate 

The climate patterns of the Northern and Southern Hemispheres generally mirror each other. The trade winds in the southern and eastern Pacific are remarkably steady while conditions in the North Pacific are far more varied with, for example, cold winter temperatures on the east coast of Russia contrasting with the milder weather off British Columbia during the winter months due to the preferred flow of ocean currents.

In the tropical and subtropical Pacific, the El Niño Southern Oscillation (ENSO) affects weather conditions.

In the tropical western Pacific, the monsoon and the related wet season during the summer months contrast with dry winds in the winter which blow over the ocean from the Asian landmass. Worldwide, tropical cyclone activity peaks in late summer, when the difference between temperatures aloft and sea surface temperatures is the greatest; however, each particular basin has its own seasonal patterns. On a worldwide scale, May is the least active month, while September is the most active month. November is the only month in which all the tropical cyclone basins are active. The Pacific hosts the two most active tropical cyclone basins, which are the northwestern Pacific and the eastern Pacific. Pacific hurricanes form south of Mexico, sometimes striking the western Mexican coast and occasionally the southwestern United States between June and October, while typhoons forming in the northwestern Pacific moving into southeast and east Asia from May to December. Tropical cyclones also form in the South Pacific basin, where they occasionally impact island nations.

In the arctic, icing from October to May can present a hazard for shipping while persistent fog occurs from June to December. A climatological low in the Gulf of Alaska keeps the southern coast wet and mild during the winter months. The Westerlies and associated jet stream within the Mid-Latitudes can be particularly strong, especially in the Southern Hemisphere, due to the temperature difference between the tropics and Antarctica, which records the coldest temperature readings on the planet. In the Southern hemisphere, because of the stormy and cloudy conditions associated with extratropical cyclones riding the jet stream, it is usual to refer to the Westerlies as the Roaring Forties, Furious Fifties and Shrieking Sixties according to the varying degrees of latitude.

Geology

The ocean was first mapped by Abraham Ortelius; he called it Maris Pacifici following Ferdinand Magellan's description of it as "a pacific sea" during his circumnavigation from 1519 to 1522. To Magellan, it seemed much more calm (pacific) than the Atlantic.

The andesite line is the most significant regional distinction in the Pacific. A petrologic boundary, it separates the deeper, mafic igneous rock of the Central Pacific Basin from the partially submerged continental areas of felsic igneous rock on its margins. The andesite line follows the western edge of the islands off California and passes south of the Aleutian arc, along the eastern edge of the Kamchatka Peninsula, the Kuril Islands, Japan, the Mariana Islands, the Solomon Islands, and New Zealand's North Island.

The dissimilarity continues northeastward along the western edge of the Andes Cordillera along South America to Mexico, returning then to the islands off California. Indonesia, the Philippines, Japan, New Guinea, and New Zealand lie outside the andesite line.

Within the closed loop of the andesite line are most of the deep troughs, submerged volcanic mountains, and oceanic volcanic islands that characterize the Pacific basin. Here basaltic lavas gently flow out of rifts to build huge dome-shaped volcanic mountains whose eroded summits form island arcs, chains, and clusters. Outside the andesite line, volcanism is of the explosive type, and the Pacific Ring of Fire is the world's foremost belt of explosive volcanism. The Ring of Fire is named after the several hundred active volcanoes that sit above the various subduction zones.

The Pacific Ocean is the only ocean which is mostly bounded by subduction zones. Only the Antarctic and Australian coasts have no nearby subduction zones.

Geological history 
The Pacific Ocean was born 750 million years ago at the breakup of Rodinia, although it is generally called the Panthalassa until the breakup of Pangea, about 200 million years ago. The oldest Pacific Ocean floor is only around 180 Ma old, with older crust subducted by now.

Seamount chains 
The Pacific Ocean contains several long seamount chains, formed by hotspot volcanism. These include the Hawaiian–Emperor seamount chain and the Louisville Ridge.

Economy 
The exploitation of the Pacific's mineral wealth is hampered by the ocean's great depths. In shallow waters of the continental shelves off the coasts of Australia and New Zealand, petroleum and natural gas are extracted, and pearls are harvested along the coasts of Australia, Japan, Papua New Guinea, Nicaragua, Panama, and the Philippines, although in sharply declining volume in some cases.

Fishing 
Fish are an important economic asset in the Pacific. The shallower shoreline waters of the continents and the more temperate islands yield herring, salmon, sardines, snapper, swordfish, and tuna, as well as shellfish. Overfishing has become a serious problem in some areas. For example, catches in the rich fishing grounds of the Okhotsk Sea off the Russian coast have been reduced by at least half since the 1990s as a result of overfishing.

Environment

The quantity of small plastic fragments floating in the north-east Pacific Ocean increased a hundredfold between 1972 and 2012. The ever-growing Great Pacific garbage patch between California and Japan is three times the size of France. An estimated 80,000 metric tons of plastic inhabit the patch, totaling 1.8 trillion pieces.

Marine pollution is a generic term for the harmful entry into the ocean of chemicals or particles. The main culprits are those using the rivers for disposing of their waste. The rivers then empty into the ocean, often also bringing chemicals used as fertilizers in agriculture. The excess of oxygen-depleting chemicals in the water leads to hypoxia and the creation of a dead zone.

Marine debris, also known as marine litter, is human-created waste that has ended up floating in a lake, sea, ocean, or waterway. Oceanic debris tends to accumulate at the center of gyres and coastlines, frequently washing aground where it is known as beach litter.

In addition, the Pacific Ocean has served as the crash site of satellites, including Mars 96, Fobos-Grunt, and Upper Atmosphere Research Satellite.

Nuclear waste

From 1946 to 1958, Marshall Islands served as the Pacific Proving Grounds for the United States and was the site of 67 nuclear tests on various atolls. Several nuclear weapons were lost in the Pacific Ocean, including one-megaton bomb lost during the 1965 Philippine Sea A-4 incident.

In 2021, the discharge of radioactive water from the Fukushima nuclear plant into the Pacific Ocean over a course of 30 years was approved by the Japanese Cabinet. The Cabinet concluded the radioactive water would have been diluted to drinkable standard. Apart from dumping, leakage of tritium into the Pacific was estimated to be between 20 and 40 trillion Bqs from 2011 to 2013, according to the Fukushima plant.

Major ports and harbors

List of major ports

Acapulco
Auckland 
Bangkok 
Busan
Callao 
Cebu City
Dalian 
Guangzhou 
Haiphong 
Ho Chi Minh City 
Hong Kong
Honolulu 
Johor Bahru
Kaohsiung
Keelung
Long Beach
Los Angeles
Manila
Melbourne 
Nagoya 
Nakhodka
Oakland 
Osaka
Panama City
Portland
San Diego 
San Francisco
Seattle 
Shanghai
Singapore 
Sydney 
Tianjin 
Tokyo 
Vancouver
Vladivostok
Yokohama

List of seas, gulfs and bays by surface area

Philippine Sea : 
Coral Sea : 
South China Sea: 
Tasman Sea : 
Bering Sea : 
Sea of Okhotsk : 
Gulf of Alaska : 
East China Sea: 
Sea of Japan : 
Solomon Sea : 
Arafura Sea : 
Banda Sea  : 
 Yellow Sea : 
Gulf of Thailand : 
Java Sea  : 
Gulf of Carpentaria : 
Celebes Sea : 
Sulu Sea : 
Bismarck Sea : 
Flores Sea  : 
Molucca Sea : 
Gulf of Anadyr : 
Gulf of California : 
Gulf of Tonkin : 
Halmahera Sea : 
 Bohai Sea : 
Gulf of Papua :  
Koro Sea : 
 Bali Sea : 
 Savu Sea : 
Bohol Sea 
Seto Inland Sea : 
Sibuyan Sea 
Seram Sea 
Visayan Sea  
Gulf of Panama 
 Manila Bay : 
Tokyo Bay :

List of islands in the Pacific

See also 

 Asia-Pacific Economic Cooperation
 List of rivers of the Americas by coastline#Pacific Ocean coast
 Pacific Alliance
 Pacific coast
 Pacific Time Zone
 Seven Seas
 Trans-Pacific Partnership
 War of the Pacific
 Natural delimitation between the Pacific and South Atlantic oceans by the Scotia Arc

References

Further reading 

 
 
 
 
 
 
 Jones, Eric, Lionel Frost, and Colin White. Coming Full Circle: An Economic History of the Pacific Rim (Westview Press, 1993)
 
 
 
 
 Paine, Lincoln. The Sea and Civilization: A Maritime History of the World (2015).
 
 Samson, Jane. British imperial strategies in the Pacific, 1750–1900 (Ashgate Publishing, 2003).

Historiography 
 Calder, Alex, et al. eds.  Voyages and Beaches: Pacific Encounters, 1769–1840 (U of Hawai‘i Press, 1999)
 Davidson, James Wightman. "Problems of Pacific history." Journal of Pacific History 1#1 (1966): 5–21.
 
 Dirlik, Arif. “The Asia-Pacific Idea: Reality and Representation in the Invention of a Regional Structure,” Journal of World History 3#1 (1992): 55–79.
 Dixon, Chris, and David Drakakis-Smith. “The Pacific Asian Region: Myth or Reality?” Geografiska Annaler: Series B, Human Geography 77#@ (1995): 75+
 Dodge, Ernest S. New England and the South Seas (Harvard UP, 1965).
 Flynn, Dennis O., Arturo Giráldez, and James Sobredo, eds. Studies in Pacific History: Economics, Politics, and Migration (Ashgate, 2002).
 Gulliver, Katrina. "Finding the Pacific world." Journal of World History 22#1 (2011): 83–100. online
 Korhonen, Pekka. "The Pacific Age in World History," Journal of World History 7#1 (1996): 41–70.
 Munro, Doug. The Ivory Tower and Beyond: Participant Historians of the Pacific (Cambridge Scholars Publishing, 2009).
 "Recent Literature in Discovery History." Terrae Incognitae, annual feature in January issue since 1979; comprehensive listing of new books and articles.
 Routledge, David. "Pacific history as seen from the Pacific Islands." Pacific Studies 8#2 (1985): 81+ online
 Samson, Jane. "Pacific/Oceanic History" in 
 Stillman, Amy Ku‘uleialoha. “Pacific-ing Asian Pacific American History,” Journal of Asian American Studies 7#3 (2004): 241–270.

External links 

 EPIC Pacific Ocean Data Collection Viewable on-line collection of observational data
 NOAA In-situ Ocean Data Viewer plot and download ocean observations
 NOAA PMEL Argo profiling floats Realtime Pacific Ocean data
 NOAA TAO El Niño data Realtime Pacific Ocean El Niño buoy data
 NOAA Ocean Surface Current Analyses – Realtime (OSCAR) Near-realtime Pacific Ocean Surface Currents derived from satellite altimeter and scatterometer data

 
Oceans
Oceans surrounding Antarctica